The Deputy Prime Minister of the Socialist Republic of Vietnam, known as Deputy Chairman of the Council of Ministers from 1981 to 1992, is one of the highest offices within the Central Government. The deputy prime minister has throughout its history been responsible for helping the prime minister to handle Vietnam's internal policies. Since Vietnam is a one-party state, with the Communist Party of Vietnam being the sole party allowed by the constitution, all the deputy prime ministers of the Democratic Republic and the Socialist Republic have been members of the party while holding office. 

There are currently four deputy prime ministers: Trần Lưu Quang, Trần Hồng Hà, Lê Văn Thành, and Lê Minh Khái. Each Deputy Prime Minister is responsible for one particular field of the country.

The Permanent Deputy Prime Minister of the Socialist Republic of Vietnam, known as The First Deputy Prime Minister, is a member of the Central Government and a member of the Politburo. The Permanent Deputy Prime Minister (1st) is elected and determined by the Prime Minister.

Deputy Prime Ministers of the Democratic Republic of Vietnam (1945–1976)

Deputy Prime Ministers of the Republic of South Vietnam (1969–1976)

Deputy Prime Ministers of the Socialist Republic of Vietnam (1976–present)

See also
 Prime Minister of Vietnam 
 Vice President of Vietnam

Notes
1. The Politburo of the Central Committee is the highest decision-making body of the CPV and the Central Government. The membership composition, and the order of rank of the individual Politburo members is decided in an election within the newly formed Central Committee in the aftermath of a Party Congress. The Central Committee can overrule the Politburo, but that does not happen often.
2. These numbers are official. The "—" denotes acting deputy prime minister. The first column shows how many deputy prime ministers there have been in Vietnamese history, while the second show how many deputy prime ministers there was in that state.
3. The Central Committee when it convenes for its first session after being elected by a National Party Congress elects the Politburo. According to David Koh, in interviews with several high-standing Vietnamese officials, the Politburo ranking is based upon the number of approval votes by the Central Committee. Lê Hồng Anh, the Minister of Public Security, was ranked 2nd in the 10th Politburo because he received the second-highest number of approval votes. Another example being Tô Huy Rứa of the 10th Politburo, he was ranked lowest because he received the lowest approval vote of the 10th Central Committee when he stood for election for a seat in the Politburo. This system was implemented at the 1st plenum of the 10th Central Committee. The Politburo ranking functioned as an official order of precedence before the 10th Party Congress, and some believe it still does.

References

Bibliography
  
 

.*
Prime Ministers